Tess Liem or T. Liem is a Canadian poet from Montreal, Quebec, who published their debut poetry collection Obits in 2018. The book was named one of the year's best Canadian poetry collections by CBC Arts, and won the Gerald Lampert Award from the League of Canadian Poets in 2019.

The book was also nominated for a Lambda Literary Award for Lesbian Poetry at the 31st Lambda Literary Awards, and was longlisted for the Pat Lowther Award.

References

External links
 

21st-century Canadian poets
21st-century Canadian women writers
Canadian women poets
Canadian LGBT poets
Writers from Montreal
Living people
Year of birth missing (living people)
21st-century Canadian LGBT people